Craig William Burley (born 24 September 1971) is a Scottish former professional footballer and sports television pundit and co-commentator for ESPN.

As a player he was a midfielder from 1989 until 2004, notably playing in the Premier League for Chelsea and Derby County and in the Scottish Premier League for Celtic. He also played for Dundee and finished his career in the Football League with Preston North End and Walsall. He earned 46 caps for Scotland, scoring 3 goals.

Since retiring and working as a pundit amongst others he has worked for BBC Sport, ESPN and BT Sport.

Club career
Burley began his professional career with Chelsea in 1989, however he didn't make his debut until April 1991 when he came on as a substitute for Kerry Dixon in a 7–0 defeat against Nottingham Forest. He made his first appearance in the newly formed Premier League on 5 December 1992 in a 2–1 away win at Tottenham Hotspur.

He went on to become a regular under Glenn Hoddle and played in the 1994 FA Cup Final against Manchester United, picking up a runners-up medal following a 4–0 defeat. Two years later, Chelsea got to the FA Cup semi finals where they again faced Manchester United. With the score level at 1–1, Burley hit an errant back pass to set up David Beckham for what proved to be the winning goal. Chelsea won the 1996–97 FA Cup; Burley was left out of the squad for the final but played in the semi-final against Wimbledon. He was sold by Ruud Gullit on 25 July 1997 to Celtic for £2.5 million.

He made his Celtic debut on 3 August 1997 against Hibernian, and went on to make 64 appearances scoring 20 goals before transferring back to England with Derby County on 1 December 1999 for £3 million. He played in four seasons for The Rams and suffered his first career relegation when the club lost their Premier League status at the end of the 2001–02 season.

On 12 September 2003 he signed with Dundee on a free transfer but only played twice in a two-month spell before being released and eventually signing for Preston North End in January 2004. By March he was a free agent again after only making four appearances for North End. He signed with Walsall on a free transfer for the remainder of the 2003–04 season and played five times before retiring at the end of the season.

International career
After making his Scotland debut in 1995, Burley was also in the starting line-up for a fixture against Estonia in Tallinn in October 1996, but a scheduling dispute meant the home team did not adhere to a quickly-rearranged afternoon kick-off time, and the match was abandoned at kick-off with no caps awarded to the Scotland players; the fixture was re-arranged for the following February, but Burley was injured and did not take part.

Burley played at UEFA Euro 1996 and in the 1998 FIFA World Cup in France. At France '98 he scored the Scotland goal in a 1–1 draw with Norway in Bordeaux, latching on to a ball played forward by defender David Weir. He was then sent off in the final group game against Morocco as Scotland were eliminated. His goal against Norway was the last scored by a Scotland player at a major tournament, until Callum McGregor scored his goal against Croatia in the final group stage of UEFA Euro 2020, 23 years later (held in 2021).

Burley continued to play under Craig Brown until the end of the unsuccessful 2002 FIFA World Cup qualifying campaign, captaining the side in what proved to be his penultimate appearance. After suffering injury problems, Burley won a Scotland recall against Austria in 2003 under new manager Berti Vogts but then announced his international retirement.

Media career
Burley previously worked as a pundit and commentator for ESPN UK, Absolute Radio, BT Sport and BBC Radio 5 Live. He was ESPN's lead Scottish football co-commentator as well as fill-in for Chris Waddle on Premier League broadcasts and studio pundit for FA Cup. Burley worked the 2010 World Cup and Euro 2012 as a co-commentator for ITV Sport including the 2010 World Cup Final. He then worked the 2014 World Cup and Euro 2016 as a co-commentator and studio pundit for ABC and ESPN. He is currently a pundit on the programme ESPN FC.

Personal life
He is the nephew of former Scotland manager George Burley. Burley is married to Sheryl (born 1971) and they have three children together. In 2013, Burley moved to the US state of Connecticut to work for ESPN.

Honours
Chelsea
FA Cup: 1996–97; runners-up 1993–94

Celtic
Scottish Premier Division: 1997–98
Scottish League Cup: 1997–98

Individual
SFWA Footballer of the Year: 1998

Career statistics

International appearances

See also
List of Scotland national football team captains
List of Scottish football families

References

External links

1971 births
Living people
Footballers from Ayr
Scottish footballers
Premier League players
Scottish Premier League players
Scottish Football League players
English Football League players
Chelsea F.C. players
Celtic F.C. players
Derby County F.C. players
Preston North End F.C. players
Walsall F.C. players
Dundee F.C. players
Scotland international footballers
UEFA Euro 1996 players
1998 FIFA World Cup players
Association football midfielders
Scotland under-21 international footballers
FA Cup Final players